Perumal Subramanian (born 12 November 1955) is an Indian sprinter. He competed in the men's 200 metres at the 1980 Summer Olympics.

References

External links
 

1955 births
Living people
Athletes (track and field) at the 1980 Summer Olympics
Indian male sprinters
Olympic athletes of India
Place of birth missing (living people)